Jean Aquistapace (1882–1952) was a French actor and opera singer. He appeared in around thirty films during the 1930s and 1940s.

Selected filmography
 Maurin of the Moors (1932)
 The Wonderful Day (1932)
 Madame Angot's Daughter (1935)
 Le comte Obligado (1935)
 Ramuntcho (1938)
 Girls in Distress (1939)
 The Marvelous Night (1940)
 The Beautiful Adventure (1942)
 Arlette and Love (1943)
 L'école buissonnière (1949)

References

Bibliography
 Blakeway, Claire. Jacques Prévert: Popular French Theatre and Cinema. Fairleigh Dickinson University Press, 1990.

External links

1882 births
1952 deaths
French male film actors
20th-century French male opera singers
People from Nice